Khan Abul Kalam Azad is a Bangladeshi physician and academic. He is an internist. He is the 40th principal of Dhaka Medical College and past president of the Bangladesh Society of Medicine.

Early life and education 
Azad was born in Dhaka in 1960. He is the fourth son of Abul Hossain Khan and Selina Hossain Khan.

Azad passed Secondary school certificate from West End High School, Dhaka. He passed HSC from Dhaka college in 1976. Then he got admitted in Dhaka Medical College. He is a student of batch K-35 of the institution. He passed MBBS in 1983. Azad obtained fellowship in Internal Medicine in 1991 from Bangladesh College of Physicians and Surgeons. He achieved M.D. in Internal Medicine from University of Dhaka in 1999.

Career 

In 2017, Azad was appointed as 40th Principal of Dhaka Medical College.

He also served as Dean of Faculty of Medicine, University of Dhaka until 2019. He is the incumbent Dean of Faculty of Postgraduate Medical Sciences & Research, University of Dhaka.
He is the current Principal of Popular Medical College.

Personal life 
Azad is married to Jesmine Hossain Khan. They have two sons.

International affiliation 
He is a fellow of American College of Physicians. He was awarded with the mastership by the same college for FY 2020–21.

Professional and organizational affiliations 
 Councilor, Bangladesh College of Physicians and Surgeons
 Member of Executive Committee, BCPS
 Member of executive committee, Bangladesh Medical Research Council
 Member, National Research Ethics Committee
 Councilor and member of the executive committee, Bangladesh Medical & Dental Council
 Chief administrator (Administration & finance), Bangladesh State Medical Faculty
 Past President, Bangladesh Society of Medicine
 Member of executive committee and former vice president, Bangladesh Rheumatology Society

Publications

Research works 
Azad published hundreds of research articles and reviews in national and international journals of Medicine.

Books 
101 interesting cases in clinical medicine: KAK Azad, Ahmedul Kabir, Robed Amin (2020) ; Jaypee Brothers.

Editorial activities 
 Executive editor, Journal of Dhaka Medical College
 Executive editor, Journal of Bangladesh College of Physicians and Surgeons
 Executive editor, Journal of Bangladesh Medical Association
 Member of Advisory board, Journal of Society of Medicine.
 Member, Clinical Management of COVID-19, Bangladesh

References 

1960 births
Living people
Academic staff of Dhaka Medical College and Hospital
Dhaka College alumni